Drama Queen(s) may refer to:

Albums 
 Drama Queen (Ivy Queen album), 2010
 Drama Queen (Neurosonic album), 2006
 Drama Queen, by Autozamm, 2008
 Drama Queen, by Veena Malik, or the title song, 2012

Songs 
 "Drama Queen" (DQ song), 2007
 "Drama Queen" (Vanessa Petruo song), 2004
 "Drama Queen (That Girl)", by Lindsay Lohan from the soundtrack of the 2004 film Confessions of a Teenage Drama Queen
 "Drama Queen", by Alessia Cara from In the Meantime, 2021
 "Drama Queen", by Family Force 5 from Family Force 5, 2005
 "Drama Queen", by Green Day from ¡Tré!, 2012
 "Drama Queen", by Meghan Trainor from Takin' It Back, 2022
 "Drama Queen", by Switches from Heart Tuned to D.E.A.D., 2007

Television episodes
 "Drama Queens" (Drag Race Holland), 2020
 "Drama Queens" (RuPaul's Drag Race), 2013
 "Drama Queens" (Sex and the City), 2000

Other media 
 DramaQueen, a manga/manhwa publisher
 Drama Queen, a 2006 short film featuring Joris Jarsky
 Drama Queen, a 2013 memoir by Suchitra Krishnamoorthi
 Drama Queen: One Autistic Woman and a Life of Unhelpful Labels, a 2021 memoir by Sara Gibbs
 Drama Queens, a Nintendo DS game published by Majesco Entertainment

See also
 Histrionic personality disorder
 Make a mountain out of a molehill